The Stadion an der Gisselberger Straße is a football stadium in the district of Ockershausen in Marburg, Germany.

VfB Marburg play most of their home league games here at the Gisselberger Straße stadium. The only exceptions being some cup games and friendlies against higher division clubs at the adjacent 12,000 capacity Georg-Gaßmann-Stadion.

References

External links 

 Stadion an der Gisselberger Straße on Marburg's municipal website 

VfB Marburg
Football venues in Germany
Sports venues in Hesse